The Capital College and Research Centre (CCRC) is a Nepali higher secondary school located in Balkumari, Kathmandu. CCRC was established in 2001 A.D. with a view to aid in the field of education. Since, then the school has been able to produce excellent results in both graduate and undergraduate levels. The school has also gained popularity in the field of sports. It has produced a brilliant cricket team. Also, basketball has aided more to its sports success. CCRC has criteria by which it selects its teachers. Only the teachers that can fulfill these criteria can join the college.

Academics
CCRC offers grade 11 and 12 courses in science, humanities and management streams.

Motto
The school's motto is Quest for knowledge with wisdom.

See also

 Education in Nepal
 List of schools in Nepal

External links
 , CCRC's official website

Educational institutions established in 2001
Schools in Kathmandu
Secondary schools in Nepal
2001 establishments in Nepal